Steirastoma is a genus of beetles in the family Cerambycidae, containing the following species:
 Steirastoma acutipenne Sallé, 1856
 Steirastoma aethiops Bates, 1862
 Steirastoma albiceps Bates, 1872
 Steirastoma anomala Bates, 1880
 Steirastoma breve (Sulzer, 1776)
 Steirastoma coenosa Bates, 1862
 Steirastoma genisspina Schwarzer, 1923
 Steirastoma histrionica White, 1855
 Steirastoma liturata Bates, 1885
 Steirastoma lycaon Pascoe, 1866
 Steirastoma marmorata (Thunberg, 1822)
 Steirastoma melanogenys White, 1855
 Steirastoma meridionale Aurivillius, 1908
 Steirastoma poeyi Chevrolat, 1862
 Steirastoma pustulata (Drury, 1773)
 Steirastoma senex White, 1855
 Steirastoma stellio Pascoe, 1866
 Steirastoma thunbergi Thomson, 1865
 Steirastoma zischkai Prosen, 1958

References

Acanthoderini